Nidoki  is a village in Kapurthala district of Punjab State, India. The village is administrated by a Sarpanch who is an elected representative.

Demography 
According to the 2011 Census of India, Nidoki has total number of 22 houses and population of 108 of which include 53 males and 55 females. Literacy rate of Nidoki is 71.28%, lower than state average of 75.84%.  The population of children under the age of 6 years is 14 which is 12.96% of total population of Nidoki, and child sex ratio is approximately 1000, higher than state average of 846.

References

External links
 Kapurthala Villages List

Villages in Kapurthala district